

Dinosaurs

 A catalogue of the large fossil collection belonging to Gresham College professor John Woodward is published posthumously. This catalogue contains fragments of dinosaur bone that may have belonged to a megalosaur. Because these specimens have been preserved in Cambridge's Sedgwick Museum, they are the oldest identifiably dinosaur fossil discovery whose location is still known.

References

18th century in paleontology
Paleontology